The Cochno Stone is a large cup and ring marked rock at Auchnacraig, Faifley, West Dunbartonshire, Scotland, next to the Cochno farm. It is also known variously as "Whitehill 1" and "the Druid Stone".

It features around 90 carved indentations, considered to be one of the finest sets of petroglyphs in Scotland.

The stone was reburied in 1965 to protect it against vandalism. In 2015 it was partially re-exposed for investigation during a 3-day dig by a team involving archaeologists from the University of Glasgow, with a more complete re-exposure following a year later.

References

External links

Cochno on CANMORE, Historic Environment Scotland. Retrieved 6 October 2017.
High-resolution image viewer of the Cochno Stone by Factum Foundation for Digital Technology in Conservation.

Archaeological sites in West Dunbartonshire
Prehistoric sites in Scotland
Petroglyphs
Scheduled monuments in Scotland